Antelope Reservoir is a large body of water impounded for irrigation in a semi-arid region of southeastern Oregon in the United States. Although the lake is formed by a dam across Jack Creek, most of the water enters the reservoir via the Antelope Feeder Canal. It diverts water to the reservoir from nearby Jordan Creek at a point near the Idaho border. Jack Creek, which carries minor outflows from the reservoir, empties into Jordan Creek further downstream.

History
At that time, the water in the reservoir came from intermittent surface streams.

Recreation
The Bureau of Land Management, which administers much of the grazing land in the Antelope Reservoir basin, maintains a public campground and boat ramp at the lake.  Anglers can fish for stocked trout, and wild Columbia River redband trout from Jordan Creek sometimes enter the reservoir. However, the Oregon Health Authority has issued warnings about very high levels of methylmercury contamination that makes fish caught from the lake dangerous to eat. The contamination stems from past mining activity along the headwaters of Jordan Creek, near Silver City, Idaho, where large quantities of mercury were used to separate gold and silver from other materials.

Fishing in Oregon says the lake "is a better destination for solitude than for fishing." Other activities include waterfowl watching, "gorgeous sunsets and terrific star-gazing opportunities."

See also
 List of lakes in Oregon

References

Reservoirs in Oregon
Dams in Oregon
Lakes of Malheur County, Oregon
1914 establishments in Oregon